Newton Williams may refer to:
 Newton Williams (American football)
 Newton Williams (footballer)